The Țâța is a right tributary of the river Ialomița in Romania. It flows into the Ialomița in Dealu Mare.

References

Rivers of Romania
Rivers of Dâmbovița County